Chrysophyllum lucentifolium is a plant in the family Sapotaceae, native to Central and South America.

Description
Chrysophyllum lucentifolium grows as a shrub or tree. The species is harvested for its timber.

Distribution and habitat
Chrysophyllum lucentifolium is native to an area from Costa Rica in the north to southeastern Brazil. It grows in a variety of habitats from forests to savanna.

References

lucentifolium
Flora of Costa Rica
Flora of Panama
Flora of Venezuela
Flora of western South America
Flora of Brazil
Plants described in 1946
Taxa named by Arthur Cronquist